Della Au Belatti (born March 14, 1974, in Manoa, Hawaii) is an American politician and a Democratic member of the Hawaii House of Representatives since January 2007 representing District 24. Belatti served consecutively from January 2007 until 2013 in the District 25 seat. The district includes Makiki and Tantalus, along with portions of McCully and Papakolea on the island of Oahu.

Education
Belatti graduated with an A.B. in history from Princeton University in 1996 after completing an 82-page long senior thesis, titled "A Study of Education in Hawaii, 1945-1959: Change and Continuity in Three Schools", under the supervision of Stephen Aron. She then received her Juris Doctor from the William S. Richardson School of Law at the University of Hawaiʻi at Mānoa.

Elections
2006 When Democratic Representative Brian Schatz left the state legislature and left the District 25 seat open, Belatti won the three-way September 26, 2006 Democratic Primary with 2,145 votes (43.2%), and won the November 7, 2006 general election with 3,996 votes (58.2%) against Republican nominee Tracy Okubo, who had sought the seat in 2004.
2008 Belatti was unopposed for both the September 20, 2008 Democratic primary, winning with 2,343 votes, and the November 4, 2008 general election.
In 2010, Belatti was unopposed for the September 18, 2010 Democratic Primary, winning with 3,466 votes, and won the November 2, 2010 general election with 4,302 votes (59.4%) against Republican nominee Isaiah Sabey.
2012 Redistricted to District 24, and with Democratic Representative Isaac Choy redistricted to District 23, Belatti won the August 11, 2012 Democratic Primary with 3,024 votes (64.1%); her 2010 Republican challenger, Isaiah Sabey was unopposed in the Republican primary, setting up a rematch. Belatti won the November 6, 2012 general election with 5,367 votes (62.1%) against Sabey.

References

External links
Official page at the Hawaii State Legislature

1974 births
Living people
21st-century American politicians
21st-century American women politicians
American women educators
American women lawyers
American lawyers
Democratic Party members of the Hawaii House of Representatives
Hawaii lawyers
Politicians from Honolulu
Princeton University alumni
Schoolteachers from Hawaii
William S. Richardson School of Law alumni
Women state legislators in Hawaii